Erich Erwin Schricker, called "Winnie", (22 August 1878 – 20 October 1914) was a German footballer who played as defender in the 1890s and early 1900s.

Football career
Erwin Schricker was son of a privy councilor in Strasbourg, which at that time belonged to the German Empire. He came from a middle-class background and played his youth football together with his elder brother Ivo Schricker with local team Straßburger FV. During the summer of 1894 both brothers moved as a high school students to Karlsruhe. Here they joined and played for Karlsruher FV, where they met Walter Bensemann, the great pioneer of German and European football.

During Basel's 1895–96 season both brothers played two games for FC Basel. The first game they played was the home game on 1 December 1895 as Basel played a 2–2 draw with FC Excelsior Zürich. Joan Gamper was teammate in that game. The second game they played with Basel was on 8 March 1896 as Basel were defeated 1–3 by Grasshopper Club. Both Schricker's played only these two games for Basel, without scoring a goal.

Following their time with Basel both returned to their club of origin Straßburger FV and later both again moved back to Karlsruher FV. Erwin Schricker was killed in action during World War One. Ivo Schricker became football fonctionnaire and later was the third General Secretary of FIFA (1932–1951).

Notes

Footnotes

References

Sources
 Rotblau: Jahrbuch Saison 2017/2018. Publisher: FC Basel Marketing AG. 
 Die ersten 125 Jahre. Publisher: Josef Zindel im Friedrich Reinhardt Verlag, Basel. 
 Verein "Basler Fussballarchiv" Homepage

Footballers from Strasbourg
RC Strasbourg Alsace players
Karlsruher FV players
FC Basel players
German footballers
Association football defenders
1878 births
1914 deaths
German military personnel killed in World War I